Alfred Dubs, Baron Dubs (born 5 December 1932) is a British Labour politician and former Member of Parliament.

Early life and education 
Alfred Dubs was born in Prague, Czechoslovakia to a Jewish father, Hubert and a gentile mother, Bedriska. Hubert worked in the cotton industry, whilst Bedriska, originally from Austria, was a qualified dietician. Dubs was one of 669 Czech-resident, mainly Jewish, children saved by British stockbroker Nicholas Winton, and others, from the Nazis on the Kindertransport between March and September 1939. Hubert had fled to England the day the Nazis arrived in Czechoslovakia and met young Alf at Liverpool Street station. Alf later said that he clearly remembered leaving Prague station at age six and not touching the food pack given to him by his mother for the next two days. His mother was initially denied a visa but was able to join him and his father in London shortly afterwards.

Dubs learned the facts when Winton's story was broadcast on That's Life! in 1988. He later met Winton in person and campaigned for him to be honoured. Winton was finally knighted in 2003, "for services to humanity, in saving Jewish children from Nazi-occupied Czechoslovakia, 1938-39".

Dubs was educated at Cheadle Hulme School and the London School of Economics. He then worked as a local government officer  and for Ogilvy and Mather as an account executive before entering politics.

Career 

Before being elected for Battersea South, Dubs stood three times, due to closely spaced elections. In 1970 he stood for Cities of London and Westminster and was defeated by Christopher Tugendhat. In South Hertfordshire in the February and October 1974 General Elections, he was beaten by Cecil Parkinson. Both were defeats to the other largest party (nationally).

Dubs was elected in the 1979 general election as a member of parliament for Battersea South and for the next parliament was re-elected – in 1983 for Battersea (a restored seat). He lost the election of 1987 for the same seat. Dubs stood for Battersea again at the 1992 election, only to see the Conservative majority increase, against the national trend. From 1988 to 1995, he was director of the Refugee Council. On 27 September 1994, he was appointed as a Labour life peer with the title of Baron Dubs, of Battersea in the London Borough of Wandsworth. He was Parliamentary Under Secretary of State at the Northern Ireland Office from May 1997 to December 1999.

While Dubs was still in the House of Commons, John O'Farrell worked in his office and was a Labour activist in Battersea. In his book, Things Can Only Get Better, O'Farrell described the events leading up to Dubs's shock defeat by the Conservative John Bowis at the 1987 general election. 

Dubs has served on an area health authority and more recently on a mental health trust. He was chair of the Broadcasting Standards Commission until December 2003 and had previously been deputy chair of the Independent Television Commission. He is a trustee of the Open University Foundation.

In the past, he has been a local councillor, chair of the Fabian Society, chair of Liberty, a trustee of Action Aid, a trustee of the Immigration Advisory Service and of a number of other voluntary organisations.

Dubs is a patron of Humanists UK, formerly known as the British Humanist Association, as well as treasurer of the All-Party Parliamentary Humanist Group.

In 2008, Dubs participated in 42 House of Lords debates, well above average for all peers. He has spoken on many varied subjects including the National Probation Service and road safety. Dubs was chair of the Road Safety Foundation.

Dubs lists his main home as a cottage in the Lake District in Cumbria, which enabled him to claim over £26,000 of overnight subsistence expenses in 2007–08, although he has lived in Notting Hill, London, since 1964. In May 2009, he argued in justification that Lords regard the overnight allowance as a payment in lieu of salary. "We are the only legislators in the world that don’t get paid," he said. "The overnight thing is quite generous because it compensates for not having a salary. In practice that’s how it works."

Dubs is a vice-president of the Debating Group.

He was awarded Humanist of the Year 2016 by the British Humanist Association at an awards ceremony in London and an Honorary Silver Medal of Jan Masaryk at the Czech Republic Ambassador's residence in London in November 2019. In 2021, he had his Czech citizenship restored (alongside his British one) and thus became the first Czech-British member of the House of Lords.

During the 2020 coronavirus pandemic, Dubs was among a number of Humanists UK patrons to contribute morale-boosting messages of resilience, hope, and inspiration on National Prison Radio.

Dubs amendment 
In 2016, Lord Dubs tabled what became section 67 of the Immigration Act 2016 by which UK local authorities admitted unaccompanied minors housed in EU refugee camps who are mainly asylum seekers. It responded to the European migrant crisis. Originally rejected by the House of Commons, the provision was accepted by the government following a second debate and vote in favour by the Lords. In February 2017, the Home Office removed this as a type of permission to enter, in the light of other new provisions targeted at family reunion, after accepting 350 of the  3,000 whom analysts expected it would apply to.

A new amendment was proposed by Lord Dubs in January 2020, to require the UK government to negotiate an agreement with the EU to ensure that unaccompanied children in Europe could continue to come to the UK to join a close relative, who was in the process of seeking refugee status, as part of the law effecting the Withdrawal Agreement. The amendment was supported by the House of Lords, but was rejected by the House of Commons due to the Government opposing it. It would expand the laissez-passer system of Restoring Family Links for settled refugees, in line with latest European Union practice. It would also expand the vulnerable person resettlement and vulnerable children resettlement schemes which began in 2016.

See also
 Road Safety Foundation
 Campaign for Safe Road Design

References

Times Guide to the House of Commons 1992

External links
 Profile on Parliament website

 Profile on TheyWorkForYou

interview on United States Holocaust memorial museum archives

1932 births
Living people
Politicians from Prague
English people of Czech-Jewish descent
Jewish British politicians
Labour Party (UK) MPs for English constituencies
Councillors in the City of Westminster
English atheists
English humanists
People educated at Cheadle Hulme School
Alumni of the London School of Economics
Kindertransport refugees
Refugees ennobled in the United Kingdom
UK MPs 1979–1983
UK MPs 1983–1987
Czechoslovak refugees
Labour Party (UK) life peers
Czechoslovak emigrants to England
Naturalised citizens of the United Kingdom
Czech emigrants to England
Chairs of the Fabian Society
British Jews
Recipients of the Silver Medal of Jan Masaryk
Life peers created by Elizabeth II